Félix Pouilly (born 22 September 1994) is a French former professional road cyclist.

Major results

2012
 1st  Road race, National Junior Road Championships
 1st Stage 3 Regio-Tour Juniors
 8th Paris–Roubaix Juniors
2015
 4th Paris–Roubaix Espoirs
2016
 4th Paris–Troyes

References

External links

1994 births
Living people
French male cyclists
Sportspeople from Lille
Cyclists from Hauts-de-France
21st-century French people